Bethany Shondark Mandel (née Bethany Ann Horowitz) is a conservative American columnist and political and cultural commentator who writes for Deseret News and Ricochet.  She was named one of "36 under 36" by The Jewish Week in 2013, one of the "Forward 50" in 2015, and one of the Jewish Telegraphic Agency's "50 Jews everyone should follow on Twitter" in 2019.

Early life and education 
Mandel was raised by her mother near Rochester, New York, at times in poverty.  Her mother died of lupus when Mandel was 16. Her father died by suicide when she was 19, after struggling with an addiction to opioid painkillers.  At 18, she changed her name to Bethany Shondark Murphy, taking her mother's maiden name. Mandel graduated from Rutgers University in 2008 with a degree in history and Jewish studies.

Career 
Upon graduation, Mandel moved to Washington, DC, and worked for Washington Hebrew Congregation while looking for a position in conservative politics. After reading about the Jay Pritzker Academy near Siem Reap in Cambodia, she wrote and asked to teach at the school, becoming a fifth grade teacher there for a year.  Returning to Washington, DC, in 2010 to pursue an Orthodox conversion to Judaism, she found work as a fundraiser and writer at the Heritage Foundation, and then as a marketer, editor and blogger for Commentary magazine. Her advocacy for conservative causes led to her being named as one of "36 under 36" individuals reinventing Jewish life by the Jewish Week in 2013.

Since 2013, she has been a freelance writer and commentator while working from home to raise her children.

Mandel co-wrote a book with Karol Markowicz called Stolen Youth: How Radicals Are Erasing Innocence and Indoctrinating a Generation, which was released in 2023.

"Heroes of Liberty" 
Mandel edits the children's book series "Heroes of Liberty," which consists of biographies of right-wing cultural and political figures marketed to conservative families. The books in this series avoid mention of issues that could cause discomfort to conservative parents, such as LGBT identities or the out-of-wedlock birth of Alexander Hamilton. 

In January 2022, a Facebook advertising account related to Heroes of Liberty was banned for violating Meta's "Low Quality or Disruptive Content" policy. It was later restored, and a Facebook spokesman wrote that its banning had been the result of a "mistake". There had been backlash on social media, as well as from prominent Conservative commentators and politicians such as Senator Ted Cruz. In a Heroes of Liberty video launched in February 2021, Mandel accuses the Scholastic Corporation of indoctrinating children by publishing books with themes concerning racism, LGBTQ identities and general anti-Americanism, marketing such books through school book fairs to children from families that would not intentionally purchase books with such content.

Views

Comments on refugee resettlement in the U.S. 

In 2015, Mandel spoke publicly against the resettlement of Syrian refugees in Highland Park, New Jersey, arguing that without sufficient support to find good jobs, these refugees might become radicalized. However, in 2021, she criticized the Biden administration for not doing more to speedily resettle Afghan refugees in the U.S.

Opposition to COVID-19 lockdown continuation 
During the COVID-19 pandemic in the United States, Mandel was outspoken in her opposition to the continuation of lockdowns after the initial month. In one tweet, she said:

Following this, the term "Grandma Killer" trended on Twitter, and Mandel added "Grandma Killer" to her Twitter bio.
 
Mandel opposes mask mandates for children, a position she states in her opinion columns and on Twitter.

Other 
In March 2023, Mandel struggled and failed to define the word "woke" while criticizing it in a viral video interview clip.

Personal life 
Mandel was born to a Catholic mother and a Jewish father, and sought out Rabbi Barry Freundel for an Orthodox conversion that would make her Jewish status universally recognized. She has also said that she left the Reform movement in which she originally affiliated because of its close association with progressive and liberal politics.

She completed her conversion in 2011. In 2014, she learned that the rabbi had filmed her naked while preparing her for conversion.  She wrote an article entitled "The Convert Bill of Rights" that went viral, making her a spokeswoman for the many victims of the Freundel scandal. She served on a committee appointed by the Rabbinical Council of America to suggest safeguards against future abuses in the conversion process. For this work, the Forward named her one of the "Forward 50" in 2015, and the Rutgers University Hillel honored her with its Young Alumni Award at its 2016 Annual Gala. She has also said that it became clear to her that the RCA did not want to enact meaningful changes to its conversion program, that she resigned from the committee when she understood this, and that the experience left her disenchanted with Orthodoxy as a whole. As a consequence, she and her husband stopped participating in Orthodox Jewish institutions, such as synagogues and schools, before finding a supportive synagogue in Kemp Mill several years later.

She is married to Seth Mandel and is the mother of five children.

References 

1986 births
Living people
21st-century American journalists
21st-century American writers
American columnists
Jewish American journalists
American political commentators
American political writers
American Zionists
Jewish American writers
New Jersey Republicans
Rutgers University alumni
People from Highland Park, New Jersey
21st-century American Jews